Barbara Weinstein is a professor of Latin American and Caribbean history at New York University. Her research interests include race, gender, labor, and political economy, especially in relation to the making of modern Brazil.

Early life
Weinstein earned her undergraduate degree from Princeton University and her PhD from Yale University.

Career
Weinstein undertook postdoctoral fellowships from the National Endowment for the Humanities and the Fulbright Program. In 1998, she was awarded a Guggenheim Fellowship. In 2000, Weinstein joined the history faculty at the University of Maryland. There, she was director for the Center for Historical Studies at UMD and was senior editor for Hispanic American Historical Review. In 2007 Weinstein was president of the American Historical Association, and in 2010–2011 she was a Radcliffe Institute Fellow.

Research
Weinstein has extensively studied the post-colonial roots of Brazil, particularly the progressive São Paulo region, racial identity, and wealth inequality. The São Paulo region first came to prosperity during the coffee boom of the mid-nineteenth century; the coffee plantations were initially worked by African and creole slaves, and later through the subsidized immigration of white European laborers. She describes the process by which the predominantly white upper class in the 1920s created a foundational myth for the success of the region, linking their culture to the enterprising spirit of the bandeirantes and the progressive attitudes of the abolitionists. The cultural identity of the region was as "the shiny, modern engine pulling the nation forward", with the non-white indigenous peoples and former slaves relegated to the wayside of history. She notes the modern economic prominence of the region as an industrial center on the global scale as a contrast to its past as a labor-intensive agricultural economy, addressing the continued geographic wealth disparity from a neo-developmentalist standpoint.

Academic freedom
In her inaugural address to the American Historical Association, Weinstein was sharply critical of post-9/11 changes to US entrance visa policies. She argued that increased barriers to foreign scholars to participate in workshops and conferences and accept positions in the United States represented a threat to academic freedom. She presented the cases of Waskar Ari, a recent graduate of Georgetown University who had been visiting family in Bolivia before joining the faculty at the University of Nebraska at Lincoln, and of Tariq Ramadan, a Swiss Islamic scholar who had been offered a position at the University of Notre Dame. Neither scholar's visa was approved. She argued that excluding historians with direct experience in rapidly changing areas was counterproductive from a security standpoint. Ari's visa was approved after two years.

Publications

Books

Selected articles

 Article arguing the benefits of increased public scrutiny of government records.

References

External links
Homepage at New York University Department of History

Historians of Latin America
21st-century American historians
New York University faculty
Yale Graduate School of Arts and Sciences alumni
Princeton University alumni
Living people
American women historians
21st-century American women writers
Year of birth missing (living people)